Anna Vigfúsdóttir á Stóru-Borg (died 1571), was an Icelandic landlord. 

She was a rich heiress famous for her love to the poor shepherd Hjalti Magnusson, and her long feud with her brother, judge Pal, who refused to accept their love and tried to prevent them from marrying and to take control over her estates. 

Her story was the subject of a novel by Jón Trausti, titled Anna frá Stóruborg.

References

 http://timarit.is/view_page_init.jsp?pageId=4378430|titill=Ást og útlegð í Paradísarhelli. Fálkinn, 21. tölublað 1962.
 http://timarit.is/view_page_init.jsp?pageId=4378430|titill=„Hér gengur enginn aftur“. Þjóðviljinn, 24. júlí 1985.

16th-century Icelandic people
1571 deaths
Year of birth unknown
16th-century Icelandic women
Icelandic landowners
16th-century landowners
16th-century women landowners